A barangay tanod, also known as a barangay police officer – and sometimes as BPSO (which can stand for barangay public safety officer, barangay peacekeeping and security officer, or barangay police safety officer) – is the lowest level of law enforcement officer in the Philippines.  He is a watchman for a barangay who is supervised by the barangay captain and performs a variety of police functions. Tanods are "front liners in the preparation and response to any type of atrocities, public disorders, emergencies and even disasters or man-made calamities that threaten peace and order and public safety." They may be unarmed or armed with a baton or bolo knife (a type of machete).

Duties
While tanods cooperate with the Philippine National Police (PNP), they are not a part of the PNP. They do not have the same authority as police officers. Rather, tanods augment the police and fulfill "certain functions which the police force cannot immediately discharge especially with respect to the implementation of national and local laws within barangays." The Local Government Code of the Philippines sets out the basic duties and responsibilities of a tanod. The Department of the Interior and Local Government provides training and a fuller definition of the tanod's duties.

Tanods may also either be unarmed or armed with simply a baton or a bolo knife, the latter a type of machete. They are not officially armed with guns, though some do carry arms.  Those who do carry a gun may have obtained a private license as a private citizen and not as part of their official tanod duties; others carrying firearms while on duty may be deemed as doing so illegally.

While often described as volunteers, tanods may be receiving some payment and other benefits paid out of the barangay's, municipality's, or city's funds, most of which would come from the Internal Revenue Allotment supplemented by other sources. Tanods in different parts of the country may be receiving different pay rates and benefits, being dependent on the wealth as well as needs of their local communities. In Cebu City, the city government permits each barangay to pay a tanod an "honorarium" of 4,000 pesos per month. In other places, tanods only receive 300 pesos per month.

In 2004, there were over 700,000 tanods. (There are about 140,000 personnel of the Philippine National Police.) The number of tanods per barangay varies, however, from city to city or from municipality to municipality. The city of Cebu authorizes each barangay to hire up to 20 tanods. In 2011, the city of Baguio, with a population of approximately 325,000, had 392 tanods across 88 barangays, or an average of 4.5 per barangay. In Cagayan de Oro, there are 950 tanods across 56 barangays, or about an average of 17 per barangay. In the province of Southern Leyte, there were 3,452 tanods as of 2012.

History

Tanods were well established even before the passage of the current Local Government Code of 1991.

Gallery

See also
Police officer
 Local government in the Philippines
Philippine Flag
DILG

References

External links
 PRESIDENTIAL DECREE No. 1508 (repealed by R.A. 7160) ESTABLISHING A SYSTEM OF AMICABLY SETTLING DISPUTES AT THE BARANGAY LEVEL
 R.A. 7160 AN ACT PROVIDING FOR A LOCAL GOVERNMENT CODE OF 1991

Law enforcement in the Philippines
Barangays of the Philippines
Local politicians in the Philippines
Positions of subnational authority
Tagalog words and phrases